Thee Toledo Reign (known commonly as Toledo Reign) is a women's full-contact tackle football team in the Women's Football Alliance. Based in Toledo, Ohio they play in the spring and early summer, usually between April and July. The Reign has played home games at various stadiums in the northwest Ohio and southeast Michigan regions including Bedford Public Schools (Michigan) and Central Catholic High School (Toledo, Ohio).  In the 2014 season the Reign played home games at both Waite High School (Toledo, Ohio) and Fremont Ross High School. The Reign originally played in the Women's Professional Football League.

Season-By-Season

|-
| colspan="6" align="center" | Toledo Reign (WPFL)
|-
|2004 || 3 || 7 || 0 || T-3rd National North || --
|-
|2005 || 6 || 4 || 0 || T-3rd National || --
|-
|2006 || 4 || 4 || 0 || 2nd National North || --
|-
|2007 || 3 || 5 || 0 || 2nd National North || --
|-
|2008 || colspan="6" rowspan="1" align="center" | Did Not Play 
|-
| colspan="6" align="center" | Toledo Reign (WFA)
|-
|2009 || 1 || 7 || 0 || 4th National Central || --
|-
|2010 || 1 || 7 || 0 || 4th National North Central || --
|-
|2011 || 4 || 4 || 0 || 2nd National North Central 2 || --
|-
|2012 || 3 || 5 || 0 || 1st National Division 5 || Lost WFA First Round (Indy Crash)
|-
|2013 || 1 || 7 || 0 || 4th National Division 3 || --
|-
|2014 || 6 || 2 || 0 || 1st National NE Region-Northeast || Lost WFA First Round (Columbus Comets)
|-
!Totals || 32 || 52 || 0
|colspan="2"|

* = current standing

2009

Season schedule

2010

Season schedule

2011

Standings

Season schedule

2012

Standings

Season schedule

2013

Standings

Season schedule

2014

Standings

Season schedule

References

External links
 Team Website

Women's Football Alliance teams
Sports teams in Toledo, Ohio
American football teams in Ohio
American football teams established in 2004
Women's sports in Ohio